Gymnogramma pyrozancla is a moth in the genus Gymnogramma. It is in the family Lacturidae.

Distribution 
Gymnogramma pyrozancla occurs in South Africa.

References 

Lepidoptera of Africa
Moths described in 1911
Zygaenoidea